The 1965 1. divisjon was the 21st completed season of top division football in Norway.

Overview
The season was contested by 10 teams, and Vålerengen won their first championship. 

Vålerenga's 27 points was at the time a record for most points in a season, one more than Lyn achieved in the previous season. Viking and Sandefjord BK were relegated to the 2. divisjon.

Teams and locations
''Note: Table lists in alphabetical order.

League table

Results

Season statistics

Top scorer
 Harald Berg, Lyn – 19 goals

Attendances

References
Norway - List of final tables (RSSSF)

Eliteserien seasons
Norway
Norway
1